Ya'akov Edri (also spelt Edery or Edrey, born 25 November 1950) is an Israeli politician, serving as the mayor of Or Akiva. He served as a member of the Knesset for Likud and Kadima between 2003 and 2013, as well as holding the posts of Minister of Immigrant Absorption, Minister of Negev and Galilee Development, Minister of Health and a Minister without Portfolio.

Biography
Born in Morocco, Edri emigrated to Israel in 1959. He attended the University of Haifa, where he gained a BA in political science and an MA in public administration.

Between 1989 and 2003, he served as mayor of Or Akiva, where he currently resides. In 2003, he was elected to the Knesset on the Likud list. On 10 March 2003, he was appointed Deputy Minister of Internal Security. In late November 2005, he resigned from Likud and joined Kadima. On 18 January 2006 he was appointed Minister of Health and the Minister for the Development of the Negev and the Galilee.

Edri retained his seat in the 2006 elections, and on 27 July was named Minister without Portfolio responsible for Jerusalem Affairs. As part of a cabinet reshuffle in July 2007 he became both Minister of Immigrant Absorption and Minister of Negev and Galilee Development. He lost the former portfolio on 14 July 2008 when Eli Aflalo was appointed to the post.

On 25 February 2007 he was appointed to be responsible for Israel's sixtieth anniversary celebrations. On the same day, he was questioned under caution on suspicion of having tried to receive personal benefits in return for promoting a police commander, Ya'akov Zigdon, whilst he was Deputy Minister of Internal Security. He denied the charges.

He retained his seat in the 2009 elections after being placed thirteenth on the Kadima list. On 5 December 2012, in the days leading up to the 2013 elections, with polls showing Kadima either barely getting into the Knesset or not even passing the threshold, Edri announced he would not be contesting the elections. He then returned to local politics and resumed his post as mayor of Or Akiva.

References

External links

Yaakov Edri Israeli Ministry of Foreign Affairs

1950 births
Living people
Jewish Israeli politicians
Kadima politicians
Likud politicians
Mayors of places in Israel
Members of the 16th Knesset (2003–2006)
Members of the 17th Knesset (2006–2009)
Members of the 18th Knesset (2009–2013)
Ministers of Health of Israel
Moroccan emigrants to Israel
20th-century Moroccan Jews
People from Or Akiva
University of Haifa alumni